The Moment is the eighth studio album by American saxophonist Kenny G. It was released by Arista Records in 1996, and reached number 1 on the Billboard Top Contemporary Jazz Albums chart, number 2 on the Billboard 200, number 9 on the Top R&B/Hip-Hop Albums chart and number 16 on the Canadian Albums Chart.

The second single taken from this album, "Havana", was remixed and released to dance clubs in the United States, and these remixes went to number 1 on the Hot Dance Club Play chart in 1997, earning Kenny G his first number 1 on this chart. The remixes were by Todd Terry and Tony Moran.

Track listing 
 "The Moment" (Kenny G) – 6:02
 "Passages" (Kenny G) – 5:57
 "Havana" (Kenny G/Walter Afanasieff) – 7:22
 "Always" (Kenny G) – 5:35
 "That Somebody Was You" (with Toni Braxton) (Kenny G/Babyface/Walter Afanasieff) – 5:02
 "The Champion's Theme" (Kenny G/Walter Afanasieff) – 4:21
 "Eastside Jam" (Kenny G) – 5:09
 "Moonlight" (Kenny G/Walter Afanasieff) – 5:59
 "Gettin' On The Step" (Kenny G/Walter Afanasieff) – 4:17
 "Every Time I Close My Eyes" (with Babyface) (Babyface) – 4:58
 "Northern Lights" (Kenny G/Walter Afanasieff) – 5:01
 "Innocence" (Kenny G/Walter Afanasieff) – 3:58

Personnel 
 Kenny G – all other instruments (1, 2, 4, 7), soprano saxophone (1-7, 9, 10, 12), alto saxophone (8), tenor saxophone (11), bass (11), drums (11)
 Walter Afanasieff – keyboards (3, 5, 6, 8, 11), all other instruments (5, 6, 8), acoustic piano (9), bass (9, 11), drums (9, 11), guitars (12)
 Dan Shea – keyboards (5), drum programming (5), rhythm programming (5)
 Babyface – backing vocals (5, 10), lead vocals (10), keyboards (10), drum programming (10)
 Greg Phillinganes – acoustic piano (10)
 Michael Thompson – guitars (1-11)
 Nathan East – bass (10)
 Paulinho da Costa – percussion (1-9, 11)
 Sheila E – percussion (10)
 William Ross – string arrangements (1, 3, 6, 8, 12)
 Chris Bordman – string arrangements (2, 11)
 Toni Braxton – lead and backing vocals (5)
 Marc Nelson – backing vocals (5)
 DeDe O'Neal – backing vocals (5)

Production 
 Producers – Kenny G; Walter Afanasieff (tracks 3, 5, 6, 8 & 11); Babyface (tracks 5 & 10).
 Engineers – Steve Shepherd (tracks 1-4, 6, 7, 9, 11 & 12); Dana Jon Chappelle (tracks 5 & 8); Brad Gilderman (track 10).
 Additional Engineering – Dana Jon Chappelle (tracks 3 & 12); Steve Shepherd (track 8).
 Strings recorded by Johnny Richards (tracks 2, 4 & 11); Humberto Gatica (tracks 3 & 12); Dana Jon Chappelle (track 8).
 Vocals on track 5 engineered by Brad Gilderman 
 Mixed by Mick Guzauski
 Art Direction and Design – Angelo Skouras
 Photography – Matthew Rolston
 Management – Dennis Turner

Singles

Certifications and Sales

References 

1996 albums
Kenny G albums
Arista Records albums
Albums produced by Walter Afanasieff